Vishnu Govind is an Indian re-recording mixer, sound designer and sound editor. He has worked in over 150 films in Malayalam,Tamil,Hindi and Telugu languages. He won the National Film Award for Best Audiography (Re-recordist of the final mixed track) for the Malayalam film Malik (2020). Govind is also a recipient of the Kerala State Film Award for Best Sound Design along with Sree Sankar, for the films Unda (2018) and Ishq (2019).

Early life 
A native of Thiruvalla, Govind attended St. Berchmans College, Changanassery, graduating in Physics. While at St. Berchmans, he met future sound designer/editor Sree Sankar with whom he has collaborated on a number of projects. Since they both shared keen interest in music and movies, they became friends and eventually set off to pursue a career in Audio Engineering. 

In 2006, Govind enrolled in the graduate program of Film and Television Institute of Tamil Nadu (FTIT), formerly known as Adayar Film Institute, for Sound Engineering & Sound Recording. During his time in college, he encountered and became friends with Alphonse Puthren, Karthik Subbaraj, Nalan Kumarasamy, Vijay Sethupathi, Bobby Simha, Rajesh Murgeshan and Shabareesh Varma; all of these men would go on to be successful filmmakers, actors and musicians.

Career 
Govind started his career as an ADR recordist in AVM Studios, Chennai. He first worked on Alphonse Puthren’s short film Neram(2012) before quitting the job to focus entirely on films. His feature film debut came with Karthik Subbaraj’s Tamil film, Pizza(2012). The film marked the start of his partnership with Sree Sankar and they went on to establish their studio, Sound Factor.

Govind and Sankar had created a sound script for Pizza(2012) and used the most advanced audio format for cinema available at the time and incidentally becoming the first South Indian film mixed in Dolby 7.1 surround sound. The film was received well by audiences and critics alike. M.Suganth of The Times of India noted “While Resul Pookutty’s Oscar win in 2009 created an awareness of this community, in Tamil cinema, it was Pizza in 2012, that made people sit up and take notice of sound design”.They were nominated for the Mirchi Music Awards for Best Sound Mixing that year for designing the soundscape of the film and went on to collaborate with Karthik Subbaraj in his two future films - Jigarthanda(2014) and Iraivi(2016). The former set a landmark by becoming the first South Indian film to be mixed in Dolby Atmos.

Govind along with Sankar made his Malayalam film debut with Neram(2013) and went on to work with its director, Alphonse Puthren in Premam(2015) and Gold(2022).Starting in 2017, with Soubin Shahir’s debut film Parava, Govind has also served as the re-recording mixer for a number of films. The duo won two consecutive Behindwoods Gold Medal for Best Sound for Iruthi Suttru(2016) and Aval(2017). Both these Tamil films were remade in Hindi as Saala Khadoos(2016) and House Next Door(2017) respectively.He won the Kerala State Film Award for Best Sound Design for the films Unda(2018) and Ishq(2019), which he shared with Sankar.

In 2020, he teamed up with Mahesh Narayanan for his films C U Soon and Malik. Having previously collaborated with Narayanan in Take Off(2017) as its sound designer, Govind handled the design, editing and mixing of sound for Malik. The film's theatrical release was delayed due to the COVID-19 pandemic and eventually got released on Amazon Prime Video in 2021. It received mostly positive responses from the critics. Behindwoods wrote: “The sound design was fabulous. The presence of deep bass at the time of actions and the perfect balance of ambience sound with the dialogues that carried an intensity made the scenes much more effective”. The film earned him his first National Film Award for Best Audiography (Re-recordist of the final mixed track). The jury appreciated him for “creating a life like ambience through a dextrous audio scope."

Govind worked with A.R Rahman for the film Malayankunju(2022), which marked Rahman’s return to Malayalam cinema as a composer, after a hiatus of 28 years. In an interview with The Hindu, Sajimon Prabhakar, director of the film said, “It was not an easy project for the sound designers. We don’t know what are the sounds that one can hear under the ground. They had no references as well.”Govid used Dolby Atmos, an immersive sound format, to mix the sound in the film. Following its release, the reception was generally positive with the film receiving praises for its scope, ambition and technical aspects. Lalitha Suhasini, former editor of Rolling Stone India wrote “The movie’s soundscape brings to mind Danny Boyle’s 2010 film ‘127 Hours’, both incidentally scored by A.R. Rahman. Govind makes us feel stuck with Anikuttan by creating a brilliantly lulling silence in the film.”  Nirmal Jovial of The Week wrote “Malayankunju is a film that deserves a theatrical watch. The kind of experience it offers on a small screen will not be comparable to that on the big screen.”

Since 2020, he has worked on the sound and mixing of numerous films, notably Anjaam Pathiraa(2020), Soorarai Pottru(2020), Ayyappanum Koshiyum(2020), Operation Java(2021), Kaanekkaane(2021), Mahaveeryar(2022), and Thallumala(2022).

Selected filmography

Awards 
 2019: Kerala State Film Awards for Best Sound Design along with Sree Sankar for Unda & Ishq
 2020: National Film Awards for Best Audiography(Re-recordist of the final mixed track) for Malik

References

External links 
 
 Facebook

Year of birth missing (living people)
Living people
Re-recording mixers
Indian sound designers
Indian sound editors
Best Audiography National Film Award winners
Kerala State Film Award winners
Indian audio engineers